Julianna McCarthy is an American actress.

Biography and career
McCarthy began her career on the New York stage and in the mid-1950s appeared in Inherit the Wind.[3] While in the cast, she met and married actor Michael Constantine on October 5, 1953; they had two children, Thea Eileen and Brendan Neil. Their marriage ended in divorce in 1969.

McCarthy was an original cast member of the soap opera The Young and the Restless, starring as matriarch Liz Foster from 1973 to 1986. She reprised the role in 1993, 2003–2004, and 2008, returning for her final appearance in June 2010. While she was taken off of contract in late fall 1982 and didn't make appearances for months, she was brought back on a recurring basis in time for the show's tenth anniversary, appearing semi-regularly for the next couple of years until Liz moved to London. Later, she returned after Jill gave birth to a son, Billy, and was seen semi-regularly during the show's 30th anniversary when an ailing Liz revealed that Jill had been adopted. Her storyline concerned Jill's determination to find her birth parents. The character of Liz died in June 2010 on-screen.

McCarthy has also appeared in motion pictures as diverse as The Last American Virgin, The Distinguished Gentleman, The Frighteners, Starship Troopers and Ted Bundy.

She had a recurring role as Mila in Star Trek: Deep Space Nine, appearing in the episodes "Improbable Cause", "The Dogs of War" and the final episode, "What You Leave Behind". McCarthy also had recurring roles in Paradise and the 1991 remake of Dark Shadows as Mrs. Johnson, the housekeeper. In the show's flashbacks, she played the role of the calculating Collins relative Abigail.

Filmography

Film

Television

External links
 

Actors from Erie, Pennsylvania
American film actresses
American soap opera actresses
American television actresses
Living people
Actresses from Pennsylvania
20th-century American actresses
21st-century American actresses
Year of birth missing (living people)